Stanley Herbert Saville (21 November 1889 – 22 February 1966) was an English first-class cricketer active 1910–31 who played for Middlesex and Cambridge University. The elder brother of Clifford Saville, he was born in Tottenham; died in Eastbourne.

References

1889 births
1966 deaths
English cricketers
Middlesex cricketers
Cambridge University cricketers
Oxford and Cambridge Universities cricketers
Demobilised Officers cricketers